Steve H. Murdock is an American sociologist and the former director of the United States Census Bureau. He has held named professorships in sociology at Texas A&M University, the University of Texas at San Antonio and Rice University. Murdock served as the first official demographer of Texas.

Biography
Murdock is a graduate of North Dakota State University and he received a Ph.D. in sociology from the University of Kentucky. He was a Regents Professor and Head of the Department of Rural Sociology at Texas A&M University. In 2001, Murdock became the first official demographer of the state of Texas. He was later the Lutcher Brown Distinguished Chair in Demography and Organization Studies at the University of Texas at San Antonio and the Director of the Institute for Demographic and Socioeconomic Research.

He was nominated to serve as director of the United States Census Bureau in the summer of 2007 by George W. Bush and he held the position from January 2008 until the change in presidential administrations in January 2009. He was the Allyn R. and Gladys M. Cline Professor of Sociology at Rice University until retiring in 2019.

References

Living people
American sociologists
Directors of the United States Census Bureau
North Dakota State University alumni
University of Kentucky alumni
Rice University faculty
Texas A&M University faculty
University of Texas at San Antonio faculty
Year of birth missing (living people)
George W. Bush administration personnel